Polyspirella is a genus of sea snails, marine gastropod mollusks in the family Pyramidellidae, the pyrams and their allies.

Species
Species within the genus Polyspirella include:
 Polyspirella aglaia (Bartsch, 1915)
 Polyspirella callista (Bartsch, 1915)
 Polyspirella pellucida (G.B. Sowerby III, 1897)
 Polyspirella trachealis (Gould, 1861)

References

External links
 To World Register of Marine Species

Pyramidellidae
Monotypic gastropod genera